Aşk-ı Memnu (Ottoman Turkish for "the forbidden love") is a Turkish drama television series originally broadcast on Kanal D between 2008 and 2010. It is an adaptation of Halit Ziya Uşaklıgil's 1899 novel Aşk-ı Memnu set in contemporary Istanbul instead of the novel's late 19th-century setting. With ensemble cast starring Beren Saat, Kıvanç Tatlıtuğ, Selçuk Yöntem, Hazal Kaya & Nebahat Çehre.

Synopsis
Adnan Ziyagil, a rich Istanbul businessman lives an idyllic life in his mansion on the shore of Istanbul's Bosporus strait with his two children: teenage daughter Nihal and eleven-year-old son Bülent, his orphaned younger relative Behlül, and various house staff. Behlül, son of Adnan's cousin, moved in after his parents died in a car accident when he was young. He is in his 20s as the series starts. Ms. Deniz de Courton is the children's tutor and she has been living in the household long before the death of Adnan's wife. Deniz is of both Turkish and French heritage and is known to the entire household as "Mademoiselle". She was "entrusted" with the children by Adnan's deceased wife on her deathbed.

A wealthy widower, Adnan attracts the attention of Firdevs Yöreoğlu, who has two daughters and has recently lost her husband. Peyker Yöreoğlu (Firdevs' eldest daughter) dated Behlül but marries Nihat Önal, son of another wealthy Istanbul family as the story begins. At their wedding, Adnan and Firdevs' youngest daughter, Bihter Yöreoğlu bond over the loss of their loved ones. Adnan falls in love with the much younger and beautiful Bihter. He proposes to her and she agrees to marry him even though she knows that her mother fancies him. There is no love lost between mother and daughter as Bihter blames her mother for her father's death after she cheated on him with another man. Firdevs is also not a favorite of Nihat's father, the rich but cunning businessman Hilmi Önal. Hilmi dislikes Firdevs because she is greedy, cunning, and self-centered; he vows to make her life a living hell. Firdevs – along with her maid, Katya – moves in with the Ziyagils after she suffers a serious car accident.

The marriage of Bihter and Adnan begins well as Bihter tries to endear herself to Adnan's children. Adnan is devoted to Bihter but their age difference soon shows in their widely different reactions to events. Everyone knows Behlül as a playboy, more interested in girls than in his university studies. Bihter has held a grudge against him since he left her sister Peyker. Living together in the Ziyagil mansion, Behlül falls head over heels in love with Bihter. He tries to stay away and has feelings of guilt toward his uncle, but it proves a losing battle as he becomes more and more captivated by Bihter. She initially rejects him, but later falls for him. Their "forbidden love" (Aşk i Memnu in Turkish) becomes the centerpiece of the story which ends tragically. The series is an in-depth look at the damage created by their illicit affair on themselves and the entire Ziyagil household.

Characters

Series overview

Television Ratings
The series grew popularity over the course of its two season run. The pilot episode garnered 9.6 million viewers on its initial release in Turkey, with the amount rising until the first season finale, which 16.14 million viewers have watched. The second season premiered with 15.1 million viewers with the number fluctuating between 15 and 27 million viewers throughout the season. The series' finale, 41st episode of the season and the 79th episode overall, was watched by record-breaking 27.1 million viewers, making it the highest-watched episode of any TV show of all time in Turkey, with almost 40% of the population watching it.

Other adaptations
The series follows a 1975 adaptation of the novel starring Müjde Ar as Bihter and Itır Esen as Nihal, taking place in the original late 19th-century setting. A Spanish-language American remake titled Pasión prohibida began airing in 2013. Later, the Indian channel Star Plus broadcast the remake of this show as Dil Sambhal Jaa Zara. A Romanian adaptation was also produced by Antena 1 under the title Fructul oprit in 2018; Antena 1 was sued by the writers of Aşk-ı Memnu in 2020 and lost all rights to Fructul oprit, as a court has decided that way too many scenes had been precisely copied.

International broadcasts
Aşk-ı Memnu has broken rating records in Turkey. The series is the top-rated series there. A major hit in Pakistan with 11.9 ratings on its last episode. It was seen by more than 90 million people in Pakistan. Aired thrice, it was the first foreign drama to get so many ratings in Pakistan. The series was renewed for a fourth time in Pakistan and is currently airing on a YouTube Channel "Dramas Central" in partnership with Kanal D and the Dot Republic Media. Aşk-ı Memnu was dubbed in many languages, including Urdu, Persian, Arabic, Hindi, Portuguese, and Spanish.
Broadcasters carrying the series include.
Algeria - Al jazeera 
Turkey – Kanal D
Bosnia & Herzegovina – Hayat TV
Afghanistan – Tolo TV
Pakistan – Urdu 1 (Dubbed in Urdu language)
Pakistan – Dramas Central (YouTube) (Dubbed in Urdu language)
America and Europe – Rishtey TV (Dubbed in Hindi language)
Bangladesh –  Channel I (Dubbed in Bengali language)
Saudi Arabia – MBC 4
Egypt – Melody Drama
Lebanon – LBC
Iran – GEM Classic Channel (Dubbed in Persian language)
Bulgaria – bTV, bTV Lady, Nova TV, Diema Family
Montenegro – TV In
Morocco – 2M Maroc
Tunisia – Nessma TV
Croatia – Nova TV, Doma TV
Serbia – Prva TV
Hungary – TV2
Greece – ANT1
Slovenia – POP TV
Slovakia – TV Doma
Romania – Kanal D, Pro 2
China – XJTV (Dubbed in Uyghur language)
Israel – Viva
Kazakhstan – 31 Kanal
Uzbekistan
Macedonia – Kanal 5
Lithuania – LNK
Albania – Klan TV
Georgia – Maestro TV
Chile – Canal 13
Latvia – LNT
Estonia – Kanal 2
Ecuador – Gama TV
Peru – Latina Televisión
Paraguay – Telefuturo
Argentina – Telefe
Brazil – Band (Dubbed in Portuguese language)
Colombia – Caracol Televisión
Mexico – Imagen TV
Czech Republic – Kino Barrandov
Ethiopia – Kana TV
United States - Univision Dubbed in Spanish. Set to premiere in 2020.

References

External links

Aşk-ı Memnu YouTube page

2008 Turkish television series debuts
2010 Turkish television series endings
Turkish drama television series
Television series by Ay Yapım
2010s Turkish television series
2000s Turkish television series
Kanal D original programming
Television shows set in Istanbul
Television series produced in Istanbul
Turkish television series endings